Dickson Dam is a flow regulation dam constructed in 1983 which impounded the Red Deer River creating a reservoir known as Gleniffer Lake (Alberta). The dam was created to control for floods and low winter flows, to improve quality of the river, to create a recreational resource and to provide a reliable, year-round water supply sufficient for future industrial, regional and municipal growth.

Generation
The dam is owned by the Government of Alberta.  Algonquin Power owns a small hydropower station that was added to the dam.  It consists of three 5 MW Barber turbines with Ideal Generators. Commercial operations began on January 16, 1992. Water management of the reservoir is directed by the provincial Ministry of Environment and Water. All water control structures at the site, including the dam, intake, headgates, and spillway, are owned by the Province of Alberta and administered by Alberta Environment and Water,

Under the Dickson Power Purchase Agreement signed in 1990, all electrical power generated by the facility is sold to TransAlta Utilities Corporation. The 20-year contract expires on January 16, 2012.

Low reservoir water levels were a concern in 2010.

Gleniffer Reservoir Provincial Recreation Area
In the summer of 2009, Alberta Tourism, Parks and Recreation consolidated six provincial recreation areas (PRAs) at Dickson Dam and around Gleniffer Lake  (Dickson Dam–Cottonwood PRA, Dickson Dam–Dickson Point PRA, Dickson Dam–North Dyke PRA, Dickson Dam–South Dyke PRA, Dickson Dam–North Valley PRA, Dickson Dam–South Valley PRA) into one PRA renamed Gleniffer Reservoir PRA. Motorboating, waterskiing, swimming, and sailboarding are allowed. There are rainbow trout in a trout pond. Pike, walleye, Rocky Mountain whitefish, and brown trout are also found nearby.

References

Dams in Alberta
Dams completed in 1983